David Homeli Mwakyusa (born 9 November 1942) is a Tanzanian CCM politician and Member of Parliament for Rungwe West constituency since 2000. He became the Minister of Health in 2005-2010.

References

1942 births
Living people
Tanzanian medical doctors
Chama Cha Mapinduzi MPs
Tanzanian MPs 2000–2005
Tanzanian MPs 2005–2010
Tanzanian MPs 2010–2015
Tabora Boys Secondary School alumni
Makerere University alumni
University of Dar es Salaam alumni